Celastrol (tripterine) is a chemical compound isolated from the root extracts of Tripterygium wilfordii (Thunder god vine) and Tripterygium regelii (Regel's threewingnut). Celastrol is a pentacyclic nortriterpen quinone and belongs to the family of quinone methides. In mice, celastrol is an NR4A1 agonist that alleviates inflammation and induces autophagy. Also in mice, celastrol increase expression of IL1R1, which is the receptor for the cytokine interleukin-1 (IL-1). IL1R1 knock-out mice exposed to celastrol exhibit no leptin-sensitizing or anti-obesity effect.

In in vitro and in vivo animal experiments, celastrol exhibits antibacterial, antioxidant, anti-inflammatory, anticancer, and insecticidal  activities. It has been shown to have obesity-controlling effects in mice by inhibiting negative regulators of leptin.  Celastrol has also shown to possess (by inhibition of NF-κB in the hypothalamus) anti-diabetic effects on diabetic nephropathy and improve whole-body insulin resistance.

Celastrol inhibits IKK-NF-κB signaling via multiple molecular targets: direct inhibition of IKKα and β kinases, inactivation of CDC37 and p23, which are HSP90 chaperone proteins, inhibition of proteasome function and activation of HSF1, which triggers the heat shock response. The available evidence indicates that celastrol bonds covalently to the thiol groups of cysteine residues in its molecular targets.

Celastrol also has demonstrated in vitro inhibitory effects against the carbapenemase of CRE Klebsiella pneumoniae, in combination with thymol, a monoterpene.

References 

Quinone methides
Triterpenes
Hydroxy acids
Keto acids
Enones
Polyenes
Enols